is an action role-playing game developed and published by Bandai Namco Entertainment for PlayStation 4, PlayStation 5, Windows, Xbox One, and Xbox Series X/S. The seventeenth main entry in the Tales series, it was originally planned to release in 2020 but was delayed to September 2021 due to internal quality issues and the ability to launch the game on more platforms. It's also the first game of the series with a worldwide simultaneous launch. The game follows a man and a woman from the opposing worlds of Dahna and Rena and their journey to end the Renans' oppression of the Dahnan people.

Developed by a team composed of both series veterans and newcomers, the aim was to revitalize the Tales series. Minoru Iwamoto, one of several artists who worked on Tales of Zestiria and Tales of Berseria, returns as both character designer and art director. The game is built using Unreal Engine 4. Upon release, the game received generally favorable reviews and won the award for Best RPG at The Game Awards 2021. It sold 2 million units by April 2022.

Gameplay
Like previous games in the series, Tales of Arise is an action role-playing game, although its gameplay has gone through unspecified alterations as part of its development goals while retaining the basic Tales battle system, dubbed the Linear Motion Battle System. The game has a big focus on evading and countering, with Tales of Graces, a 2009 entry praised for its combat, cited as inspiration. Unlike many of the previous titles in the series, the game does not feature multiplayer, with the development team deciding to focus on various interactions between characters in combat, including the addition of the "Boost Strike" feature, allowing multiple party members to perform destructive attacks together under certain conditions.

Story

Setting
Arise takes place in a setting divided between the medieval world of Dahna and the advanced world of Rena. Three centuries ago, the Renans based on Rena's artificial moon Lenegis invaded and conquered Dahna, subsequently enslaving the population and dividing the land into five isolated realms, each ruled by a Lord: The barren and scorching Calaglia, dark and cold Cyslodia, the fertile plains of Elde Menancia, the windy mountains of Mahag Saar and the rainforests of Ganath Haros. Periodically, the "Crown Contest" is held to decide which among the five Lords is chosen to become the next Renan Sovereign, based on the amount of astral energy extracted from Dahna's population and environment stored on the Master Cores in each Lord's possession.

The Dahnan resistance against the Renan occupation is currently divided into four independent movements spread across the planet: The "Crimson Crows" from Calaglia, the "Silver Swords" from Cyslodia, the "Gold Dust Cats" from Elde Menancia and the "Dark Wings" from Mahag Saar. The only realm who lacks a resistance cell is Ganath Haros whose Lord subjugated the entire population, regardless of race.

Plot
At the realm of Calaglia, a masked Dahnan slave with no memories of his past, nicknamed "Iron Mask", gets himself involved with the Crimson Crows when they rescue a Renan girl called Shionne Vymer Imeris Daymore, whom he finds familiar, from imprisonment. Shionne is afflicted with a curse (known as "thorns") that hurts anyone who touches her. While evading their pursuers, the slave manages to pull a blazing sword from the Master Core in Shionne's possession and use it to repel the Renan forces. As only Iron Mask can wield the sword due to his lack of sense of pain, he and Shionne form an alliance to take down the five Lords and gather the other Master Cores they possess. With help from the Crimson Crows, the pair confront and defeat Calaglia's Lord, Balseph. In the occasion, the slave's mask partially breaks and he remembers his name, "Alphen". After liberating Calaglia, Alphen, Shionne and the Crimson Crows' leader Zephyr depart to the realm of Cyslodia, guided by Rinwell, a mage and member of the Silver Swords. Once arriving there, Zephyr is captured by agents serving the local Lord Ganabelt Valkyris, led by Zephyr's son Law. Having a change of heart once his father is sentenced to a public execution, Law assists Alphen and the others in an attempt to rescue Zephyr who ends up being killed by Ganabelt himself. Law joins Alphen, Shionne and Rinwell to avenge his father and the four confront and kill Ganabelt.

The party then sets to Elde Menancia, a realm whose Lord, Dohalim il Qaras, abolished slavery and encourages Renans and Dahnans to coexist. However, they learn from the dying Migal, leader of the Golden Dust Cats about a plot from Dohalim's aide Kelzalik to drain the astral energy of the Dahnans in secret by poisoning them for his own gains. Accompanied by Migal's sister, the Dahnan knight Kisara, Alphen and the others stop Kelzalik's plans and Dohalim sentences him to exile, before renouncing his Lordship and joining the party with Kisara. At the realm of Mahag Saar, the party discovers that the Dark Wings overthrew the local Lord, Almeidrea Kaineris, who is in hiding. While looking for Almeidrea, Shionne confesses to the others that her objective is to collect all the Lords' Master Cores to create the ultimate Master Core, "Renas Alma", in order to get rid of her curse. Upon news that Almeidrea was captured, the party attends her public execution just to discover that she took advantage of the situation to lay a trap for the Dark Wings and kill them while extracting their astral energy before escaping. In the occasion, Rinwell recognizes Almeidrea as the Lord who killed her parents.

By lending a boat, the party boards Almeidrea's battleship and defeat her in combat, when the Lord of Ganath Haros, Vholran Igniseri, appears and kills Almeidrea before attacking Alphen. During their fight, the rest of Alphen's mask is destroyed, unlocking his memories and restoring his sense of pain before the enemy retreats, taking Shionne captive. Once in safety, Alphen reveals to the others that he was a test subject for Renan experiments 300 years ago, preceding the invasion, and forced to take part in the "Spirit Channeling Ceremony" with a Renan maiden called Naori Imeris who is an ancestor of Shionne's, using the Renas Alma. However, the ceremony failed, causing countless deaths and it was Naori who put the mask on Alphen to seal his memories before sending him back to Dahna in a spaceship, his body preserved in cold sleep before he awakened one year ago. The party storms Vholran's castle, where they reunite with Shionne and defeat Vholran, securing all the Lords' Master Cores. A mysterious being appears before the party, using a sixth Master Core in her possession to absorb the astral energy of the other cores to form the Renas Alma and flees with it and Vholran's body.

During the following month, Alphen and the others help the citizens of Ganath Haros to rebuild until a bio-mechanical structure sent by the Renans begins draining the astral energy of Dahna directly and sending it to Rena's moon Lenegis. To prevent Dahna's destruction, the party infiltrates the structure and manages to temporarily shut it down. Searching for answers, the group locates Alphen's spaceship, restore it, then travel to Lenegis, where they discover that Vholran, who is still alive and the Renas Alma are in custody of the Helganquil, alien beings who are the true inhabitants of Rena, who intend to use them to reenact the Spirit Channeling Ceremony, whose real purpose is to drain all Astral Energy from Dahna. They also learn that the human Renans living on Lenegis are descendants of Dahnans kidnapped from their home planet to take part in the Helganquil's plan to funnel Dahna's Astral Energy to Rena's Great Spirit, who had already drained all the energy from Rena and killed almost all life in the planet.

The party launches an attack on Rena where they confront and defeat the Great Spirit, destroying its core and retrieving the Renas Alma. However, when Alphen and Shionne begin the ceremony to seal it, Vholran attacks them, stealing the Renas Alma and challenging Alphen to a duel while Shionne seals the Great Spirit inside her body. Alphen defeats Vholran who refuses to concede and instead commit suicide by blowing himself up together with the Renas Alma, destroying it. Shionne asks Alphen to kill her to destroy the Great Spirit, but Alphen instead calls for the Great Spirit of Dahna's help and together, they stop the destruction of both planets by fusing them into one single world while saving Shionne by getting rid of her thorns. Some time after the battle, Alphen and Shionne get married, as they and their friends enjoy new lives in a world where Renans and Dahnans live in peace.

Characters

Development
According to producer Yusuke Tomizawa, development of Arise began before the announcement of the Definitive Edition of Tales of Vesperia in 2018. Beginning development under the codename "Arise", the aim was to reevaluate and evolve the Tales franchise formula. The game's title derived from its codename as it best exemplified both the game's story themes and the team's wishes. While previous Tales games used a dedicated in-house engine, Arise was built using Unreal Engine 4, allowing much higher graphical quality compared to earlier entries. Character models and movement were also improved, with the team aiming at the same level of quality found in 3D films and television. While the previous game Tales of Berseria had been a cross-generation game for PlayStation 3 and PlayStation 4, Arise was made exclusively for modern hardware. Tomizawa stated that while the team was aiming for a level of quality that can be enjoyed globally, the game would not neglect its Japanese fans.

Arise was developed by Bandai Namco Studios. The team included veterans going as far back as Tales of Phantasia, alongside newcomers who were passionate about the series. The art director and character designer was Minoru Iwamoto, who had worked on both Berseria and Tales of Zestiria. This was the first time the same person had filled both roles, and was part of Bandai Namco's move towards unifying the game's themes and artstyle. The world design went in a darker direction compared to earlier entries, both to further the series evolution and appeal to the Western market. Despite the overt focus on 3D graphics, 2D anime cutscenes are still planned as with previous entries. Similar to the previous games in the series, the anime sequences were produced by Ufotable, while the game's score was written by Motoi Sakuraba. The game's theme song is "Hibana" by Kankaku Piero, which marks the third time a theme song in the Tales series has had both an English version and a Japanese version. Ayaka performs two songs for the game, "Blue Moon" for the game's grand theme song and her cover version of My Little Lover's "Hello, Again (Mukashi kara Aru Basho)" (Hello, Again 〜昔からある場所〜, Hello, Again ~A Place that has Been Around for a Long Time~) for the game's insert song.

Release
Arise was revealed at E3 2019, although details of the game had leaked on the internet a few days before. The game was originally planned to release in 2020 for PlayStation 4, Windows, and Xbox One, but was delayed to September 10, 2021, due to internal issues and the ability to launch the game on PlayStation 5 and Xbox Series X/S.

On October 3, 2021, a new DLC content was announced, including a crossover quest featuring Kirito and Asuna, the main characters of the Sword Art Online franchise, along with new costumes based on them.

Reception

Tales of Arise received "generally favorable" reviews, according to review aggregator Metacritic. Tales of Arise won for Best RPG at The Game Awards 2021. IGN said it had the best story and gameplay of any Tales game since Tales of Symphonia.

Sales
In under one week on sale, Tales of Arise had shipped over 1 million copies, becoming the fastest-selling entry in the series. By October 2021, the game had shipments and digital sales of 1.5 million. By April 2022, the game had sold 2 million units.

Notes

References

External links
 
 

2021 video games
Action role-playing video games
Bandai Namco games
PlayStation 4 games
PlayStation 5 games
Arise, Tales of
Unreal Engine games
Video games developed in Japan
Windows games
Xbox One games
Xbox Series X and Series S games
Video games featuring female protagonists
Video games scored by Motoi Sakuraba
Video games with cel-shaded animation
The Game Awards winners